Zaluzhany (before 1946 – Vatsevychi) is a village (selo) in Drohobych Raion, Lviv Oblast, in Western Ukraine. It belongs to Drohobych urban hromada, one of the hromadas of Ukraine.

History 
The local Catholic parish was first mentioned in 1410.

References 

Zaluzhany